In 1982 the National League, also known as British League Division Two, was the second tier of speedway racing in the United Kingdom.

Summary
The league champions were Newcastle Diamonds.

Milton Keynes rider Brett Alderton was killed in an accident during the second half of a league meeting at King's Lynn. The 18-year old Australian sustained a fatal head injury on 17 April.

Final table

National League Knockout Cup
The 1982 National League Knockout Cup was the 15th edition of the Knockout Cup for tier two teams. Newcastle Diamonds were the winners of the competition.

First round

Second round

Quarter-finals

Semi-finals

Final
First leg

Second leg

Newcastle were declared Knockout Cup Champions, winning on aggregate 118–74.

Leading final averages

Riders & final averages
Berwick

Steve McDermott 8.83
Bruce Cribb 7.85
Brian Collins 7.24
George Hunter 7.23
Paul Thorp 6.47
Rob Grant Sr 6.12
Mike Caroline 5.45
Rob Carter 2.75

Boston

Steve Lomas 9.17
David Gagen 9.09 
Rob Hollingworth 8.86
Dennis Mallett 5.94
David Blackburn 4.71
Guy Wilson 4.68
Peter Framingham 4.19
Robbie McGregor 3.60
Chris Cole 2.97

Canterbury

Barney Kennett 8.66
Denzil Kent 7.74
Ian Clark 7.64
Darryl Simpson 5.18
Keith Pritchard 4.46
Kevin Brice 4.36
Nigel Couzens 4.36
Mark Martin 3.74

Crayford

Barry Thomas 8.75 
Trevor Banks 7.62
Mike Spinks 6.83 
Alan Sage 6.48 
Alan Mogridge 5.96
Laurie Etheridge 5.67
Paul Bosley 5.22
Mike Pither 5.02
Trevor Barnwell 3.53
Chris Tritton 3.23
Andy Galvin 2.40

Edinburgh

Dave Trownson 9.21 
Eric Broadbelt 7.05
Brett Saunders 7.03
Ivan Blacka 6.54
Benny Rourke 6.00
Chris Turner 5.95
Mark Fiora 5.69
Roger Lambert 4.36
Ian Westwell 2.87
Sean Courtney 2.53

Ellesmere Port

John Jackson 9.15
Steve Finch 8.56
Rob Maxfield 7.26
Eric Monaghan 6.97 
Phil Alderman 5.98 
Billy Burton 5.98 
Glen Parrott 4.91
Rob Tate 4.63

Exeter

John Barker 9.07
Les Sawyer 8.56
Andy Campbel 8.38
Keith Millard 8.18
Bob Coles 6.54 
Keith Wright 4.67
Steve Bishop 4.37
Mike Semmonds 3.72
Dave Brewer 3.43

Glasgow

Steve Lawson 10.40
Kenny McKinna 8.78
Colin Caffrey 5.92
Harry MacLean 4.53
Rob Carter .86
Kym Mauger 3.67
Alan Mason 3.65
Martin McKinna 2.64
Des Wilson 1.71

Long Eaton

Alan Molyneux 9.35
Paul Stead 8.41
Dave Perks 7.94
Nigel Close 6.63 
Paul Evitts 6.46
Nicky Allott 6.20
Mark Summerfield 5.03
David Blackburn 4.56

Middlesbrough

Martin Dixon 9.39 
Steve Wilcock 9.27
Mike Spink 7.67
Geoff Pusey 7.34 
Paul Price 5.21
Rob Woffinden 4.86
Alan Armstrong 4.33
Peter Spink 3.61
Bernie Collier 1.64

Mildenhall

Derek Harrison 9.33
Ray Bales 8.78
Richard Knight 8.32
Mick Bates 7.65
Robert Henry 7.62
Carl Baldwin 7.59
Andy Warne 4.48
Carl Blackbird 4.44

Milton Keynes

Keith White 8.09
Andy Hibbs 8.00
Craig Featherby 7.25
Nigel Sparshott 7.03
Steve Payne 6.29
Tony Featherstone 5.60
Paul Clarke 4.08

Newcastle

Joe Owen 11.01 
Rod Hunter 10.12
Bobby Beaton 9.01 
Alan Emerson 7.81
Keith Bloxsome 7.35
Tom Owen 7.12
Robbie Foy 3.65
Barry Shearer 1.47

Oxford

Ashley Pullen 7.73
Graham Drury 7.54
Colin Ackroyd 7.42
Simon Cross 6.88
Kevin Smart 5.13
Wayne Jackson 5.10
Brian Woodward 4.83
John Frankland 4.50
Gary Chessell 3.90
Bill Barrett 3.14
Mick Handley 3.06
Mick Fletcher 2.15

Peterborough

Andy Hines 8.64
Dave Allen 8.26
Mick Hines 7.33
Andy Buck 6.38
Andy Fisher 5.49
Ian Barney 5.38
Neil Cotton 3.06

Rye House

Bobby Garrad 9.85 
Marvyn Cox 8.87
Kelvin Mullarkey 7.78 
Steve Naylor 7.72
Peter Johns 4.95
Andy Fines 4.68
Steve Bryenton 4.31
Garry Monk 3.04

Scunthorpe

Mike Wilding 7.88
Kevin Teager 7.18
Nigel Crabtree 7.07
Rob Woffinden 5.97
Derek Richardson 5.74
Julian Parr 5.45
Terry Kelly 5.11
Ian Gibson 4.13
Mark DeKok 4.09

Stoke

Rod North 7.24
Pete Smith 6.91
Mark Collins 6.53
Mike Sampson 6.05
Ian Robertson 6.01
Brian Havelock 5.69
Arthur Browning 5.36
Pete Ellams 5.31
Jim Burdfield 4.41
Steve Sant 3.32

Weymouth

Simon Wigg 10.36
Martin Yeates 8.46
Steve Schofield 7.10
Terry Tulloch 6.72
Les Rumsey 6.39
Stan Bear 6.00
John McNeil 5.69
Steve Crockett 3.56
Mark Minett 2.86
Rob Mather 2.85

See also
List of United Kingdom Speedway League Champions
Knockout Cup (speedway)

References

Speedway British League Division Two / National League